Jerry Richard Green (born December 15, 1946) is the John Leverett Professor in the University and the David A. Wells Professor of Political Economy at Harvard University. He is known for his research in economic theory, as well as writing the most commonly used microeconomic theory textbook for graduate school with Andreu Mas-Colell and Michael Whinston, Microeconomic Theory.

Biography 
Green received his bachelor's degree from the University of Rochester in 1967 and his Ph.D. in economics in 1970. He then joined Harvard's economics faculty. He was Harvard's Provost from 1992-1994 and chaired the economics department from 1984-1987. He is a recipient of the J. Kenneth Galbraith Prize for excellence in teaching.

He is a Senior Fellow at the Harvard Society of Fellows and a fellow of the Econometric Society. He was elected fellow of the American Academy of Arts and Sciences in 1994 and fellow of the Society for the Advancement of Economic Theory in 2012.

References

External links
 Green's homepage at Harvard Business School
 Microeconomic Theory at Oxford University Press

1946 births
University of Rochester alumni
Harvard University faculty
Fellows of the Econometric Society
Fellows of the American Academy of Arts and Sciences
20th-century American economists
21st-century American economists
Microeconomists
Living people